Natnael McDonald (born March 29, 2001) is an American soccer player who currently plays for the Mercer Bears  in the NCAA Division I.

Career 
McDonald played with Atlanta United FC academy whilst also appearing for Atlanta's United Soccer League affiliate Atlanta United 2 during their inaugural season in 2018.

McDonald signed a National Letter of Intent to play for the University of Akron men's soccer program on June 2, 2019. However he was ruled out for the 2019 NCAA Division I men's soccer season due to injury.

References

External links

2001 births
Living people
American soccer players
Association football defenders
Atlanta United 2 players
USL Championship players
Soccer players from Georgia (U.S. state)